Océan is a department of South Province in Cameroon. The department covers an area of 11,280 km and as of 2001 had a total population of 133,062. The capital of the department lies at Kribi.

Subdivisions
The department is divided administratively into nine communes and in turn into villages.

Communes 
 Akom II
 Bipindi
 Campo
 Kribi (urban)
 Kribi (rural)
 Lokundje
 Lolodorf
 Mvengue
 Niete

References

Departments of Cameroon
South Region (Cameroon)